The 1963 New Zealand Royal Visit Honours were appointments by Elizabeth II to the Royal Victorian Order, to mark her visit to New Zealand that year. During her visit, the Queen attended celebrations at Waitangi. The honours were announced on 11 and 18 February 1963.

The recipients of honours are displayed here as they were styled before their new honour.

Royal Victorian Order

Knight Grand Cross (GCVO)
 Brigadier Sir Bernard Edward Fergusson  – governor-general of New Zealand.

Knight Commander (KCVO)
 Frank Leon Aroha Götz – Minister of Internal Affairs; of Auckland.

Commander (CVO)
 John Valentine Meech – of Wellington.
 Carl Leslie Spencer – of Wellington.

Member, fourth class (MVO)
 Major John Websiter Mawson – Royal New Zealand Armoured Corps; of Wellington.
 Patrick Jerad O'Dea  – of Lower Hutt.
 Charles Henry Williams  – of Wellington.

In 1984, Members of the Royal Victorian Order, fourth class, were redesignated as Lieutenants of the Royal Victorian Order (LVO).

Member, fifth class (MVO)
 Alonzo George Edgar Beal  – of Wellington.
 Major Harry Bowen Honnor – Royal Regiment of New Zealand Artillery; of Wellington.
 Douglas Alexander Johnston – of Wellington.
 Silvanus Gordon Mudge – of Wellington.

Royal Victorian Medal

Silver (RVM)
 Arthur Henry Hart – detective sergeant, New Zealand Police; of Wellington.
 Angus William McDougall – detective senior sergeant, New Zealand Police; of Wellington.
 Harold Eugene Symonds – of Lower Hutt.

References

1963 awards
Royal Visit Honours
Monarchy in New Zealand